The Rietvlei Wetland Reserve is a  nature reserve situated in Table View, Western Cape, South Africa. It is managed by the City of Cape Town's Environmental Resource Management Department.

The Rietvlei Wetland Reserve forms part of the greater  Table Bay Nature Reserve.

Background 
Rietvlei is considered as the most important area for waterbirds in the region and is recognized as an Important Bird Area by BirdLife International. Official recognition of its importance to biodiversity by the South African government was first afforded in 1984, when it was established as a Nature Area. This was followed by its declaration as a Protected Natural Environment in 1989, and the establishment of the Rietvlei Wetland Reserve in 1993. The first formal management plan for the reserve was developed in 1994, and this has served to guide management activities to the present.

History 
The most obvious and dramatic human-induced modification at Rietvlei was the dredging of the entire north-west section between 1974 and 1976. The ecological consequences were profound and irreversible. A sizable portion of Rietvlei's shallow ephemeral pans was changed into a permanent deep-water lake, which resulted in a total change in ecological character for this portion of the system.

Features

Visitor facilities 
Rietvlei Wetland Reserve offers various user activities, including several types of water sport recreation, bird watching, picnic, fishing and outdoor environmental education opportunities. The Rietvlei Education Centre hosts a range of environmental education programmes and utilises the two bird hides and the short footpath for field excursions.

The Milnerton Aquatic Club leases an area of land inside the nature reserve from where they promote windsurf, sail, power- and radio-controlled boating. The Southern African Foundation for the Conservation of Coastal Birds (SANCCOB) manages a rehabilitation facility at Rietvlei.

Habitats 
A range of natural and semi-natural habitats exist in this fluctuating wetland, which floods in winter and dries out in summer when the estuary mouth closes. These habitats include shallow marine waters, estuarine waters, sand/shingle shores, tidal mudflats, saltmarshes, coastal brackish saline lagoons, rivers, streams and creeks, permanent freshwater lakes and permanent and seasonal freshwater marshes and pools.

The Diep estuary 
The Diep River flows through the Rietvlei wetland and the Milnerton Lagoon, which together have generally been considered to comprise the Diep estuary. If the  contour above mean sea level is used as the estuary delineation, then the Diep estuary entirely encompasses the Rietvlei Wetland Reserve. It has one major tributary, the Mosselbank, which drains the northern slopes of the Durbanville Hills. Other tributaries include the Swart, Groen, Klein, and Riebeeck, with the Klapmuts being a tributary of the Mosselbank. The total size of the catchment is 1,495 km2 or 154,347 hectares.

Biodiversity

Birds, amphibians, reptiles and mammals 
A total of 173 species have been recorded at Rietvlei, of which 102 are waterbirds and 76 are present regularly. Breeding has been confirmed for 23 waterbird species and is suspected for a further 13 species. The high diversity of waterbirds is due to the wide range of wetland habitats present and the proximity of Rietvlei to the ocean, which allows both freshwater and coastal species to exploit the system. Fluctuating water-levels are intrinsic to Rietvlei's biological value. During peak floods, swimming birds of deep, open water abound. Birds of marshy habitats replace these as the water recedes, and waders exploiting shallow mudflats occur in great abundance just prior to the wetland drying up. Rietvlei has been ranked as the sixth most important coastal wetland in South Africa for waterbirds, and it supports an average of 5,550 birds in summer; during good years, however, numbers are boosted above 15,000. Phoenicopterus minor, a species of global conservation concern, occurs at the site, but not in globally significant numbers.

 Updated from South African Biodiversity Database <http://www.biodiversity.co.za/> as species present on site on 2011/01/10 (surveys incomplete)
 Indigenous - rare and endangered
 Anthropoides paradiseus (blue crane) (Vulnerable) (VU)
 Circus ranivorus (African marsh-harrier) (Vulnerable) (VU)
 Indigenous
 Acrocephalus gracilirostris (lesser swamp-warbler)
 Actitis hypoleucos (common sandpiper)
 Alcedo cristata (malachite kingfisher)
 Alopochen aegyptiacus (Egyptian goose)
 Anas capensis (Cape teal)
 Anas erythrorhyncha (red-billed teal)
 Anas smithii (Cape shoveler)
 Anas sparsa (African black duck)
 Anas undulata (yellow-billed duck)
 Anhinga rufa (African darter)
 Apus affinis (little swift)
 Ardea cinerea (grey heron)
 Ardea goliath (Goliath heron)
 Ardea melanocephala (black-headed heron)
 Ardea purpurea (purple heron)
 Bostrychia hagedash (hadeda ibis)
 Bradypterus baboecala (little rush-warbler)
 Bubulcus ibis (cattle egret)
 Burhinus vermiculatus (water thick-knee, water dikkop)
 Calidris alba (sanderling)
 Calidris canutus (red knot)
 Calidris ferruginea (curlew sandpiper)
 Calidris melanotos (pectoral sandpiper)
 Calidris minuta (little stint)
 Cercotrichas coryphoeus (Karoo scrub-robin)
 Ceryle rudis (pied kingfisher)
 Charadrius hiaticula (common ringed plover)
 Charadrius marginatus (white-fronted plover)
 Charadrius pallidus (chestnut-banded plover)
 Charadrius pecuarius (Kittlitz's plover)
 Charadrius tricollaris (three-banded plover)
 Chlidonias leucopterus (white-winged tern)
 Columba guinea (speckled pigeon)
 Corvus albus (pied crow)
 Egretta alba (great egret)
 Egretta garzetta (little egret)
 Egretta intermedia (yellow-billed egret)
 Elanus caeruleus (black-winged kite)
 Estrilda astrild (common waxbill)
 Euplectes orix (southern red bishop)
 Falco rupicolus (rock kestrel)
 Fulica cristata (red-knobbed coot)
 Gallinago nigripennis (African snipe, Ethiopian snipe)
 Gallinula chloropus (common moorhen)
 Haematopus moquini (African black oystercatcher)
 Haliaeetus vocifer (African fish-eagle)
 Himantopus himantopus (black-winged stilt)
 Hirundo albigularis (white-throated swallow)
 Hirundo rustica (barn swallow)
 Larus cirrocephalus (grey-headed gull)
 Larus dominicanus (kelp gull)
 Larus hartlaubii (Hartlaub's gull)
 Limosa lapponica (bar-tailed godwit)
 Macronyx capensis (Cape longclaw)
 Megaceryle maximus (giant kingfisher)
 Merops apiaster (European bee-eater)
 Microcarbo africanus (reed cormorant)
 Microcarbo coronatus (crowned cormorant)
 Milvus migrans (black kite, yellow-billed kite)
 Motacilla capensis (Cape wagtail)
 Netta erythrophthalma (southern pochard)
 Numenius arquata (Eurasian curlew)
 Numenius phaeopus (common whimbrel)
 Nycticorax nycticorax (black-crowned night-heron)
 Oxyura maccoa (Maccoa duck)
 Pelecanus onocrotalus (great white pelican)
 Phalacrocorax capensis (Cape cormorant)
 Phalacrocorax lucidus (white-breasted cormorant)
 Philomachus pugnax (ruff)
 Phoenicopterus minor (lesser flamingo)
 Phoenicopterus ruber (greater flamingo)
 Platalea alba (African spoonbill)
 Plectropterus gambensis (spur-winged goose)
 Plegadis falcinellus (glossy ibis)
 Podiceps cristatus (great crested grebe)
 Podiceps nigricollis (black-necked grebe)
 Porphyrio madagascariensis (African purple swamphen)
 Pternistis capensis (Cape spurfowl)
 Recurvirostra avosetta (pied avocet)
 Rostratula benghalensis (greater painted-snipe)
 Spatula hottentota (blue-billed teal)
 Spilopelia senegalensis (laughing dove)
 Sterna balaenarum (Damara tern)
 Sterna bergii (swift tern)
 Sterna caspia (Caspian tern)
 Sterna hirundo (common tern)
 Sterna sandvicensis (sandwich tern)
 Sterna vittata (Antarctic tern)
 Tachybaptus ruficollis (little grebe)
 Tadorna cana (South African shelduck)
 Thalassornis leuconotus (white-backed duck)
 Threskiornis aethiopicus (African sacred ibis)
 Tringa glareola (wood sandpiper)
 Tringa nebularia (common greenshank)
 Tringa stagnatilis (marsh sandpiper)
 Vanellus armatus (blacksmith lapwing, blacksmith plover)
 Vidua macroura (pin-tailed whydah)
 Alien
 Anas platyrhynchos (mallard)
 Columba livia (feral pigeon, rock dove)
 Numida meleagris (helmeted guineafowl)

 Updated from South African Biodiversity Database <http://www.biodiversity.co.za/> as species present on site on 2011/01/07
 Amietia fuscigula (Cape river frog)
 Amietophrynus pantherinus (western leopard toad)
 Strongylopus grayii (clicking stream frog)
 Strongylopus grayii grayii (clicking stream frog)
 Tomopterna delalandii (Cape sand frog)
 Xenopus laevis (common platanna)

 Updated from South African Biodiversity Database <http://www.biodiversity.co.za/> as species present on site on 2011/01/13
 Acontias meleagris (Cape legless skink)
 Afrogecko porphyreus (marbled leaf-toed gecko)
 Bradypodion pumilum (Cape dwarf chameleon)
 Chersina angulata (angulate tortoise)
 Lycodonomorphus rufulus (common brown water snake)
 Meroles knoxii (Knox's desert lizard)
 Naja nivea (Cape cobra)
 Pelomedusa subrufa (marsh terrapin)
 Pseudaspis cana (mole snake)
 Scelotes bipes (silvery dwarf burrowing skink)
 Trachylepis capensis (Cape skink)
 Trachylepis homalocephala (red-sided skink)
 Typhlosaurus caecus (Cuvier's blind legless skink)

 Updated from South African Biodiversity Database <http://www.biodiversity.co.za/> as species present on site on 2011/01/10
 Indigenous
 Aonyx capensis (Cape clawless otter)
 Felis caracal (caracal)
 Galerella pulverulenta (small grey mongoose)
 Herpestes ichneumon (large grey mongoose)
 Hystrix africaeaustralis (porcupine)
 Mus minutoides (African pygmy mouse)
 Myosorex varius (forest shrew)
 Raphicerus campestris (steenbok)
 Raphicerus melanotis (Cape grysbok)
 Alien
 Canis lupus familiaris (domestic dog)
 Felis silvestris catus (domestic cat)

Invertebrates and fish 
Zooplankton multiply rapidly after winter flooding and disappear in summer as the water dries up. In the estuary there is a range of salinities, resulting in a diverse community of zooplankton. The invertebrate fauna is a vital food source for birds and fish, the most abundant fish in the wetland being Liza richardsonii.

 Updated from South African Biodiversity Database <http://www.biodiversity.co.za/> as species present on site on 2010/12/31
 Indigenous
 Anguilla mossambica steinitzi (longfin eel)
 Caffrogobius nudiceps (barehead goby)
 Galaxias zebratus (Cape galaxia)
 Lithognathus lithognathus (white steenbras)
 Liza richardsonii (southern mullet)
 Mugil cephalus (flathead mullet)
 Rhabdosargus globiceps (white stumpnose)
 Alien
 Cyprinus carpio (carp)
 Gambusia affinis (mosquito fish)

Plant communities 
Five distinctive wetland plant communities occur: perennial wetland, reed-marsh, sedge-marsh, open pans and sedge pans. The perennial wetland is characterized by scant aquatic vegetation, dominated by Ruppia, Potamogeton and Enteromorpha. The reed-marsh is dominated by Phragmites, invaded in places by Typha. The sedge-marsh is dominated by Bolboschoenus and Juncus. The open pans are sparsely covered in macrophytes, consisting mainly of Limosella and Salicornia, and the sedge pans are dominated by Bolboschoenus in summer and Aponogeton and Pauridia in winter.

 Updated from South African Biodiversity Database <http://www.biodiversity.co.za/> as species present on site on 2011/02/02
 Indigenous
 Alternanthera sessilis
 Amellus tenuifolius
 Ammophila arenaria
 Arctotheca populifolia
 Arctotis hirsuta
 Arctotis stoechadifolia
 Athanasia dentata
 Atriplex semibaccata~
 Bolboschoenus maritimus
 Brunsvigia orientalis (candelabra flower)
 Carissa macrocarpa
 Carpobrotus acinaciformis
 Carpobrotus edulis
 Ceratophyllum demersum~
 Chasmanthe aethiopica (suurkanol)
 Chrysanthemoides incana
 Chrysanthemoides monilifera (bitoubos)
 Cladoraphis cyperoides
 Conicosia pugioniformis~
 Cynanchum africanum
 Cynodon dactylon (couch grass, kweekgras, kweek)
 Cynosurus echinatus
 Cyperus textilis
 Dasispermum suffruticosum
 Didelta carnosa~
 Ehrharta longiflora
 Ehrharta villosa~
 Euclea racemosa
 Ferraria crispa
 Ficinia indica
 Ficus natalensis~
 Gladiolus griseus
 Grielum grandiflorum
 Helichrysum niveum
 Helichrysum patulum
 Hermannia pinnata
 Hermannia procumbens~
 Indigofera complicata
 Ischyrolepis eleocharis
 Juncus kraussii~
 Kedrostis nana~
 Lavatera arborea
 Lemna minor
 Limonium equisetinum
 Limonium scabrum~
 Lolium multiflorum (Italian ryegrass, annual ryegrass)
 Lolium rigidum
 Ludwigia adscendens diffusa
 Lycium ferocissimum
 Lythrum salicaria
 Malva parviflora~
 Metalasia muricata
 Moraea flaccida
 Moraea miniata
 Morella cordifolia
 Myoporum tenuifolium (manatoka)
 Nylandtia spinosa (skilpadbessie bos, tortoise berry bush)
 Olea capensis
 Olea europaea africana
 Othonna coronopifolia
 Passerina ericoides
 Pelargonium gibbosum
 Persicaria lapathifolia
 Phragmites australis
 Phylica ericoides~
 Pistia stratiotes
 Plantago coronopus
 Plecostachys serpyllifolia
 Psoralea repens
 Rhus crenata (blink taaibos, turkeyberry)
 Rhus glauca (blou taaibos)
 Rhus laevigata
 Rhus lancea
 Rhus lucida~
 Romulea tabularis
 Rumex crispus
 Rumex lativalvis
 Ruschia macowanii
 Ruschia tumidula
 Salicornia meyeriana
 Salvia africana-lutea
 Sarcocornia capensis
 Sarcocornia natalensis~
 Sarcocornia pillansii~
 Schoenoplectus scirpoides
 Senecio burchellii
 Senecio halimifolius (tabakbos)
 Sideroxylon inerme~
 Sparaxis bulbifera
 Sporobolus virginicus
 Stenotaphrum secundatum (buffalo grass)
 Tetragonia decumbens
 Tetragonia fruticosa
 Tetragonia spicata
 Thamnochortus spicigerus
 Thinopyrum distichum
 Trachyandra filiformis
 Triglochin bulbosa
 Typha capensis (bulrush, papkuil)
 Xanthium strumarium
 Zantedeschia aethiopica
 Zygophyllum morgsana
 Alien
 Acacia cyclops (rooikrans)
 Acacia saligna (Port Jackson willow)
 Avena sativa
 Azolla filiculoides (red water fern)
 Commelina benghalensis (blouselblommetjie)
 Cortaderia selloana (pampas grass)
 Eichhornia crassipes (water hyacinth)
 Eucalyptus lehmannii
 Lolium perenne
 Paspalum vaginatum
 Pennisetum clandestinum (kikuyu grass)
 Schinus terebinthifolius

Threats 
The effects of the nearby Century City Development on Blouvlei, which used to support a large heronry holding 12 breeding species, is cause for considerable concern. Most of these birds used to forage at Rietvlei and would contribute substantially to the large numbers of birds occurring here. The effects on this breeding area will probably result in fewer birds visiting the Rietvlei area. Other threats to the wetland include siltation, which results from erosion, and pollution and eutrophication from fertilizers, pesticides, sewage works, stormwater run-off and livestock manure. Petroleum factories and suburban areas on the margin of the system also pose problems. Vast areas of the mudflats and salt marsh have been smothered by thick mats of non-native grasses, notably Paspalum vaginatum, resulting in habitat loss for waders, the most diverse and abundant community of waterbirds at Rietvlei. Other non-native species, including stands of Acacia saligna, are being cleared from large areas around the margin of the wetland.

See also 
 Diep River
 Cape Town
 City of Cape Town
 Biodiversity of Cape Town
 Diep River Fynbos Corridor
 Milnerton Racecourse Nature Reserve
 List of nature reserves in Cape Town
 Cape Lowland Freshwater Wetland

References

External links 
 City of Cape Town Nature Reserves
 City of Cape Town - Environmental Resource Management Department
 Friends of Rietvlei
 SANCCOB
 Milnerton Aquatic Club
 BirdLife site fact sheet - Rietvlei Wetland Reserve
 ekapa ioisa - North Reserves - Rietvlei Wetland Reserve
 Birds in Reserves Project - Rietvlei Wetland Reserve
 Southern African Birding - Birding Spot Wiki - Rietvlei Wetland Reserve
 South African Biodiversity - Rietvlei Wetland Reserve
 
Nature reserves in Cape Town
Protected areas of the Western Cape